Events in the year 2017 in Tajikistan.

Incumbents
President: Emomali Rahmon
Prime Minister: Kokhir Rasulzoda

Events

Sport
19-26 February – Tajikistan had four competitors at the 2017 Asian Winter Games, all in Alpine skiing.

Deaths
1 May – Yuri Lobanov, sprint canoeist, Olympic champion 1972 and several times world champion (b. 1952).
7 July – Georgy Koshlakov, politician and scientist (b. 1936).
December 28 – Mariam Nabieva, First Lady of Tajikistan (1991–1992)

References

 
2010s in Tajikistan
Years of the 21st century in Tajikistan
Tajikistan
Tajikistan